Mohammad Barakeh (born 29 July 1955) is an Israeli Arab politician. A former leader of Hadash, he served as a member of the Knesset for the party between 1999 and 2015.

Biography
Born in Shefa-'Amr, Barakeh studied mathematics at Tel Aviv University. In that time, he had formed extensive political partnerships and personal friendships with Jewish fellow students, many of which continue up to the present. The rented apartment where he lived for many years on top of an old building at Rothschild Boulevard in downtown Tel Aviv was a well-known rendezvous for political meetings. Among numerous other political actions, the first demonstration against the 1982 Lebanon War, held on the war's third day, 7 June 1982, and dispersed by police, was planned at a dramatic meeting held in Barakeh's Tel Aviv apartment.

Following the end of his studies, Barakeh returned to his hometown of Shefa-'Amr, a place with considerable importance in the internal politics of Israel's Arab citizens, and took up political activity in the local Maki branch. He was first elected to the Knesset in 1999, and was re-elected in 2003, after which he became Deputy Speaker of the Knesset.

In February 2005, Barakeh was threatened by Kahanist activist (and now-outlawed Kach party leader) Baruch Marzel over his pivotal support for Ariel Sharon's evacuation compensation bill, a move that paved the way for Israel's unilateral disengagement from the Gaza Strip and northern West Bank.

In a letter, Marzel wrote to Barakeh: "the evacuation bill was passed with your backing, and now it is only a matter of time before it is implemented on other sectors of society, including you and your friends." Marzel wrote that Barakeh's vote "in favor of expelling Jews from their homes in Gaza and the northern Samaria" would result in "appraisers [being] sent to your home to estimate its value."

Barakeh was re-elected again in 2006 and 2009. On 1 November 2009 he was indicted on four counts for actions taken at political demonstrations: assault and interfering with a policeman in the line of duty on 28 April 2005, assault on a right-wing activist who had been recording a left-wing protest on 22 July 2006, insulting a public servant (police officer) on 5 August 2006, and for confronting an official (police officer) who was discharging his legal duty on 7 July 2007. The crimes were punishable by jail terms ranging from six months to five years, and according to the Jerusalem Post, Barakeh was given one month to decide whether he wanted to request using his parliamentary immunity or stand trial. At least one human rights group posited that the charges were politically motivated. "Adalah, the Legal Center for Minority Rights in Israel, declared that the indictment against Barakeh was based on false testimony which Barakeh completely denied."

In 2014 he was convicted of assault, but cleared of the other charges; the charges of insulting a public servant and interfering with a police officer in the line of duty were withdrawn in 2011 as they fell under his parliamentary immunity. Barakeh was eventually fined 400 NIS and ordered to pay the assault victim 250 NIS.

In 2010 Barakeh joined an Israeli delegation visiting World War II-era concentration camps. His inclusion in the trip was opposed by two right-wing Israeli legislators led by Danny Danon, who claimed he would use the visit to attack Israel, and who lobbied unsuccessfully to have Barakeh barred from the commemoration. The visit drew criticism from Israeli Arabs who said the timing was inappropriate due to Israeli-Palestinian tensions.

After visiting the extermination camp, Barakeh expressed great shock: "I knew exactly where I was going, but being here, faced with the embodiment of human evil on the one hand, and the unperceivable misery of the victims on the other hand, things take on a different meaning. Everything is mixed into a human catastrophe." Barakeh commented on the piles of children's shoes displayed at the museum and said, "Any such shoe was once worn by a baby. Children are a nationality of their own, a nationality of innocence, and I cannot grasp how human beings could do such an atrocious thing."

He was re-elected for a fifth term in 2013, but prior to the 2015 elections, he announced that he was retiring from politics, and was given the symbolic 120th place on the Joint List, an alliance of Hadash and the main Arab parties.

See also
List of Arab members of the Knesset

References

External links
 

Extremist threatens Arab politician Ynetnews, 28 February 2005
Arab MKs express outrage over Shfar'am attack, 'anti-Arab incitement' Ynetnews, 4 August 2005

1955 births
Living people
Arab members of the Knesset
Deputy Speakers of the Knesset
Hadash leaders
Israeli communists
Members of the 15th Knesset (1999–2003)
Members of the 16th Knesset (2003–2006)
Members of the 17th Knesset (2006–2009)
Members of the 18th Knesset (2009–2013)
Members of the 19th Knesset (2013–2015)
People from Shefa-'Amr
Tel Aviv University alumni